Black raspberry is a common name for three species of the genus Rubus:
Rubus leucodermis, native to western North America  
Rubus occidentalis, native to eastern North America
Rubus coreanus, also known as Korean black raspberry, native to Korea, Japan, and China

Berries